Słupiec  is a village in the administrative district of Gmina Łubnice, within Staszów County, Świętokrzyskie Voivodeship, in south-central Poland.

The village has a population of  556.

Demography 
According to the 2002 Poland census, there were 572 people residing in Słupiec village, of whom 48.6% were male and 51.4% were female. In the village, the population was spread out, with 24% under the age of 18, 33.6% from 18 to 44, 16.3% from 45 to 64, and 26.2% who were 65 years of age or older.
 Figure 1. Population pyramid of village in 2002 — by age group and sex

References

Villages in Staszów County